The 2010–11 Nemzeti Bajnokság I, also known as NB I, was the 109th season of top-tier football in Hungary. The league is officially named Monicomp Liga for sponsorship reasons. The season began on 30 July 2010 and ended on 27 May 2011. Debrecen are the defending champions having won their fifth Hungarian championship and second in a row last season.

Teams
Nyíregyháza and Diósgyőr finished the 2009–10 season in the last two places and thus were relegated to their respective NB II divisions. Nyíregyháza ended a three-year stint in Hungary's highest football league while Diósgyőr were relegated after six years.

Promotion to the league was achieved by the champions of the 2009–10 NB II Eastern Division, Szolnok and by the champions of the Western Division, Siófok. Siófok return to the top league after a one-year absence while Szolnok return to the league for the first time since 1948, ending a 62-year absence.

Stadia and locations

Personnel and sponsoring

Managerial changes

League table

Positions by round

Results

Top goalscorers
Including matches played on 22 May 2011; Source: MLSZ (Click on "Góllövő lista")

See also
 List of Hungarian football transfer summer 2010

References

External links
 Official site 

Nemzeti Bajnokság I seasons
1
Hungary